Kjartansson may refer to:

Ársæll Kjartansson (born 1945), Icelandic former football player
Jón Kjartansson (1930–2004), Icelandic writer, better known as Jón frá Pálmholti
Magnús Kjartansson (1919–1981), Icelandic politician and former minister
Ragnar Kjartansson (disambiguation) various persons including
Ragnar Kjartansson (sculptor) (1923–1989), Icelandic sculptor
Ragnar Kjartansson (performance artist) (born 1976), Icelandic performance artist
Sigurjón Kjartansson (born 1968), Icelandic comedian, writer and producer and part of the comic duo Tvíhöfði with Jón Gnarr